Chepstow railway station is a part of the British railway system owned by Network Rail and is operated by Transport for Wales. Chepstow station is on the Gloucester to Newport Line. Chepstow is a historic walled border town and ancient port, situated at the southern end of the Wye Valley, two hours from London.

The line continues east from the station to Gloucester over the Chepstow railway bridge. It was formerly the junction station for the Wye Valley Railway to Monmouth Troy station until this line closed to passengers in 1959. The railway now consists of a double track line with a trailing crossover to the east of the station, plus some disused track in the former yard.

Description

The single-storey buildings on the Gloucester/Birmingham side of the line are stone and timber-built structures, in an Italianate style. They were completed in 1850 for Isambard Kingdom Brunel's South Wales Railway, and according to architectural historian John Newman were designed by N. Lancaster Owen. A canopy provides shelter. On the more popular Newport/Cardiff side, there is just a small modern shelter.

Access to this platform is via a cast-iron footbridge, making it difficult for passengers with pushchairs and the old and the infirm to cross. The footbridge is a now-rare survival of a typical GWR iron pattern, still with its wooden cladding and canopy, and is Grade II listed. It was cast in Edward Finch's ironworks, adjoining the station. In January 2021, the footbridge was removed for extensive repairs and is due to be reinstalled during the Spring. A temporary footbridge was installed prior to its removal.

Other Grade II listings at the station include the two bridges: the surviving piers and abutment of the Chepstow Railway Bridge, and the bridge providing access to the steam mill and ironworks site.

Services

The local rail service is sporadic, running an hourly service in each direction. A local campaign has been established, with the support of the local MP, Welsh Assembly members, County Council and town council, to improve rail services to the town. In May 2011, CrossCountry commenced a year-long trial of stopping its Cardiff-Birmingham- services at the station on weekdays and Saturdays. In December 2011, it was reported that the trial would be extended until at least December 2012.

As of May 2016, the service pattern consists of the hourly (with occasional two-hour gaps)  - Cardiff Central -  service (serving all intermediate stations between Gloucester & Newport) plus calls every second hour by the CrossCountry Nottingham - Cardiff Central trains.  On Sundays, there is a two-hourly service in each direction (no CrossCountry services).

Facilities
The station is staffed, and a cafe offering light refreshments is available in the main building. The ticket office is run by a third-party operator, Chepstow Trains, on behalf of Network Rail and Transport for Wales, and is open part-time, six days per week (closed from late afternoon and all day Sundays).  Outside these times, tickets must be bought on the train.  Train running information is offered via digital CIS displays and timetable poster boards.

The nearest bus stop is a 5-minute walk away in the Tesco car park; however the service is infrequent and consists of just a local service. Chepstow bus station is about  further; from here buses to a wider area may be found.  On race days, special buses are normally laid on to convey racegoers to and from Chepstow Racecourse; this is a walk of approximately half an hour's duration.

Limited station parking is available, with eleven spaces. There is a car park near the station with more spaces.

See also 
 Chepstow East railway station

References

External links
 

Chepstow
Railway stations in Monmouthshire
DfT Category F1 stations
Former Great Western Railway stations
Railway stations in Great Britain opened in 1850
Grade II listed railway stations in Wales
Railway stations served by Transport for Wales Rail
Grade II listed buildings in Monmouthshire
1850 establishments in England
Railway stations served by CrossCountry